Walsden railway station serves the village of Walsden, Todmorden in West Yorkshire, England, on the edge of the Pennines.

It is served by the Caldervale Line operated by Northern. Walsden is the last station before the boundary with Greater Manchester. The station was opened by Metro (West Yorkshire Passenger Transport Executive) on 10 September 1990 as a replacement for an earlier structure that closed on 6 August 1961. This earlier station, which was opened in 1845 by the Manchester & Leeds Railway, predecessor of the Lancashire & Yorkshire Railway, was situated between the level crossing and the north portal of Winterbutlee Tunnel, a few yards south of the present station.

Facilities

The station is unstaffed and has only basic facilities (no permanent buildings, just shelters on each platform).  Ticket vending machines are provided to allow passengers to purchase these prior to travel, whilst digital information screens and timetable posters supply train running information.  The station is fully accessible, with ramps to each platform for wheelchair and mobility impaired users.

Services

There is an hourly service (Mondays to Fridays) to Manchester Victoria and  southbound and to Leeds via Dewsbury northbound (since the May 2014 timetable change) with extra trains during peak times in each direction (including some trains to Burnley and Blackburn). Passengers wishing to access destinations on the route via Halifax during the day now have to change at Todmorden or Hebden Bridge.

In the evenings and on Sundays, the frequency remains hourly but trains run via Halifax.

History

It was the only place in Todmorden to be bombed during the Second World War Blitz, probably because the German plane had a leftover bomb after a raid and so dropped it on what appeared to be an important site.

The station has had problems with flooding for many years, with the most recent bout occurring on 26 December 2015.  The line was blocked the following day, but reopened to traffic on 28 December. Further heavy rain in November 2019 also caused the line to be closed for 24 hours because of high water levels at a river bridge just to the west of the station.

References

External links

Railway stations in Calderdale
DfT Category F2 stations
Former Lancashire and Yorkshire Railway stations
Northern franchise railway stations
Todmorden
Railway stations in Great Britain opened in 1845
Railway stations in Great Britain closed in 1961
Railway stations in Great Britain opened in 1990
Reopened railway stations in Great Britain
1845 establishments in England